Jukka Veikko Porvari (born January 19, 1954 in Tampere, Finland) is a Finnish retired professional ice hockey player who played in the SM-liiga and National Hockey League (NHL). He played for Tappara, TPS, New Jersey Devils, and Colorado Rockies.  He was inducted into the Finnish Hockey Hall of Fame in 1994. He also played at the 1980 Winter Olympics, with 7 goals and 4 assists for a total of 11 points in 7 games.

Career statistics

Regular season and playoffs

International

External links
 
 Finnish Hockey Hall of Fame bio

1954 births
Living people
Colorado Rockies (NHL) players
Finnish ice hockey forwards
Fort Worth Texans players
Ice hockey players at the 1980 Winter Olympics
New Jersey Devils players
Olympic ice hockey players of Finland
Ice hockey people from Tampere
Tappara players
HC TPS players
Undrafted National Hockey League players
Wichita Wind players